Paul I. Wen de Bakker (born 1973) is a Dutch bioinformatician who specializes in computational biology and genetic epidemiology. He has been Senior Director of Computational Genomics at Vertex Pharmaceuticals since 2015. He previously worked at Harvard Medical School from 2007 to 2012, and served as Professor of Genetic Epidemiology and Bioinformatics at the University of Utrecht from 2012 to 2015. He is known for his research on the genetics of innate resistance to HIV.

References

External links

1973 births
Living people
Dutch bioinformaticians
Dutch geneticists
Dutch statisticians
Harvard Medical School faculty
Computational biologists
Academic staff of Utrecht University
Utrecht University alumni
Alumni of the University of Bristol
Alumni of the University of Cambridge
Statistical geneticists
Scientists from Rotterdam